FSCS may refer to:

Financial Services Compensation Scheme
Future Scout and Calvary System, a joint British–American scout vehicle